The Fucha River is a river on the Bogotá savanna and a left tributary of the Bogotá River. The river originates in the Eastern Hills of the Colombian capital Bogotá and flows westward through the city into the Bogotá River. It is one of the three important rivers of the city, together with the Tunjuelo and Juan Amarillo Rivers.

Etymology 
Fucha is derived from Muysccubun, the indigenous language of the Muisca, who inhabited the Bogotá savanna before the Spanish conquest and means "her" or "female".

Description 

The Fucha River originates in the locality San Cristóbal in the Eastern Hills of Bogotá and is named in its upper course Quebrada Manzanares, San Cristóbal, Arzobispo and San Francisco River. It flows north from the Tunjuelo River westward and respectively forms the boundary between the localities Rafael Uribe Uribe (south) and Antonio Nariño (north) and Tunjuelito and Ciudad Bolivar (south) and Kennedy (north) of the Colombian capital and is canalised between the Carrera Séptima and the Avenida Boyacá. South of the locality Bosa, the Fucha River flows into the Bogotá River. The Fucha River is highly contaminated.

Wetlands 

Four of the fifteen protected wetlands of Bogotá are located in the Fucha River basin.

Gallery

See also 

 List of rivers of Colombia
 Eastern Hills, Bogotá
 Bogotá savanna
 Juan Amarillo River, Tunjuelo River

References

External links 

  Sistema Hídrico, Bogotá

Rivers of Colombia
Bogotá River
Geography of Cundinamarca Department
Geography of Bogotá
Rivers
Fucha